Rolf Randolf (born Rudolf Zanbauer; 15 January 1878 – 29 June 1941) was an Austrian actor, film producer and director.

Selected filmography
Director
 Das Geheimnis der Santa Margherita (1921)
 Wallenstein (1925)
 What the Stones Tell (1925)
 Women of Passion (1926)
 Das Geheimnis von St. Pauli (1926)
 The Beggar from the Dome of Cologne (1927)
 Linden Lady on the Rhine (1927)
 Love on Skis (1928)
 The House Without Men (1928)
  Mikosch Comes In (1928)
 Wer hat Bobby gesehen? (1930)
 Oh Those Glorious Old Student Days (1930)
 Death Over Shanghai (1932)
 The Sporck Battalion (1934)
 The Red Rider (1935)
 Königstiger (1935)
 The Right to Love (1939)
 Passion (1940)

Bibliography
 Kester, Bernadette. Film Front Weimar: Representations of the First World War in German films of the Weimar Period (1919-1933). Amsterdam University Press, 2003.

External links

Austrian film directors
Austrian male film actors
Austrian male silent film actors
20th-century Austrian male actors
Film people from Vienna
1878 births
1941 deaths